Thomas J. Minar is an American academic administrator who was the 16th president of Franklin College in Franklin, Indiana. In January 2020, he was arrested and charged with child sex crimes, In March 2022, he was found guilty of child enticement and child pornography charges, and in June he was sentenced to six years in prison.

References

External links
Prior to American University
 Transactions of the Board of Trustees, University of Illinois, Volume 67, 1993, page 390
 Niche theory and interest representation: The case of education in Washington by Minar, Thomas Jackson, Ph.D. thesis, Evanston, Illinois: Northwestern University, 1998

Prior to Franklin College
 American University Appoints New Vice President of Development, Newswise, October 1, 2008
 Conducive to Success (abstract) by Minar, Thomas J. Currents, Volume 36, Number 8, October 2010, pages 36–39
 The Seven Essentials of Highly Engaged Alumni by Marlee J. Rawski, Milwaukee, Wisconsin: Marquette University, M.A. thesis, August 2011, pages 2–3 (pages 6–7 of the pdf)
 Leadership Spots Opening Up for Gay and Lesbian Academics by Kathryn Masterson, The Chronicle of Higher Education, March 27, 2011
 Building a Program Unique to Your Institution in During Tough Times, Role of Planned Giving Gains Prominence in Louis L. Lindauer Searches Whitepaper Series for Development Leaders, Boston: Lindauer Global Inc., pages 4, 7–8 c. 2013
 Profiles of Presidential Finalists Released by Mattie Bruton, The Rambler, Lexington, Kentucky: Transylvania University, January 30, 2014, Volume 97, Issue 13, page 1
 Memorandum: Vice President of Development and Alumni Relations Tom Minar by Neil Kerwin, American University, January 23, 2015
 Wealth Screening, Part I & Part II by Cynthia Woolbright, Tom Minar, and Devon Villa Gessert, The Woolbright Group, c. 2008–2015

Prior to arrest while at Franklin College
 Franklin College names choice to succeed Moseley, Indianapolis Business Journal, January 23, 2015
 Franklin College Announces Thomas J. Minar, Ph.D, as its 16th President, Franklin College Grizzlies website, January 23, 2015
 Q&A; with Franklin College’s new president by Vic Ryckaert, Indy Star, February 16, 2015 (Archived February 25, 2021)
 Historically Baptist college elects gay president by Bob Allen, Baptist News, March 13, 2015
 Gay man takes the reins at Baptist college looking to rebrand itself by Samantha Watkins, The College Fix, March 23, 2015
 Franklin College Names New President, Inside Indiana Business, August 18, 2015
 Hail to the Chief by Ryan Trares, Daily Journal, August 29, 2015
 The New Guy on Campus: The 16th president of Franklin College moves in by Julie Cope Saetre, SOUTH: Indy's Southside Magazine, September 9, 2015 (pdf version)
 Your Philanthropy Career: How to Advance Professionally by Holly Hall, Aspen Leadership Group, c. 2015–2020
 No Big Deal: Gay and lesbian presidents report more acceptance than ever with the legalization of gay marriage. by Kellie Woodhouse, Inside Higher Ed, January 19, 2016
 Minar Sets Vision For Franklin College by Alex Brown, Inside Indiana Business, April 12, 2016
 Racial confrontations on Indiana college campuses by Amber Stearns, NUVO, July 13, 2016
 Feature: the first gentleman by Laura Olivo, The Franklin News, March 11, 2016 (Archived August 2, 2016)
 Franklin College Science Center to Serve 'Future of Industry', Inside Indiana Business, May 18, 2017
 Bio of Thomas J. Minar, Ph.D., Office of the President, Franklin College (Archived August 18, 2018)
 The Office of Franklin College's 16th President, Thomas J. Minar, Ph.D., About Franklin College (Archived December 6, 2019)
 Franklin College President to Step Down by Alex Brown, Inside Indiana Business, June 12, 2019
 Carola Minar McMullen, d. December 3, 2020, obituary published in the Door County Advocate from December 10–16, 2020, legacy.com

Arrest and end of academic career
 Thomas Minar arrest video, youtube.com, Pulliam School of Journalism, January 6, 2020
 Thomas Minar Jail Interview Part 1 and Part 2, youtube.com, Pulliam School of Journalism, January 6, 2020
 Student got 'weird vibe' from Franklin College president fired after sex crimes arrest by Dan Klein, WISH-TV, January 13, 2020
 Franklin College president arrested on sex charges, fired by Victoria Ratliff and Lacey Watt, Kokomo Tribune, January 13, 2020
 Minar no longer a Pomona trustee following arrest for child sex crimes by Hank Snowdon, The Student Life, January 14, 2020
 Franklin College terminates president after 'deeply disturbing incident', WTHR, January 13, 2020, updated January 15, 2020
 Lawyer: Grindr exchange with undercover cop led to arrest of Franklin College president by Holly V. Hays and Arika Herron, Indianapolis Star, January 14, 2020
 Former Franklin College President Charged With Sex Crimes Involving a Child, New York Times, January 14, 2020
 Details emerge in former Franklin College president's arrest, charging in Sturgeon Bay by Sammy Gibbons, Green Bay Press-Gazette, January 15, 2020

Court proceedings prior to conviction
 Ex-Franklin College president makes initial court appearance in sex crimes case by Victoria Ratliff and Emily Ketterer, The Statehouse File, a Franklin College student journalism publication, January 27, 2020, updated October 1, 2021
 UPDATE: Indiana college president charged with child enticement waives preliminary hearing by Addy Bink, WFRV; WeAreGreenBay.com, January 13, 2020, updated February 21, 2020
 Former Franklin College president makes court appearance after COVID-19 delays by Erica Irish, Washington, Indiana: Washington Times Herald, June 18, 2020
 New records add context to Minar's arrest and interrogation, Daily Journal, August 1, 2020
 Minar enters plea of not guilty as district attorney offers plea deal by Taylor Wooten, The Statehouse File, October 6, 2020, updated October 1, 2021
 Ex-Franklin College president to stand trial, Daily Journal, March 4, 2021
 Little new progress in court for ex-Franklin College president's alleged child sex crimes by Erica Irish, The Franklin News, January 4, 2021, updated March 16, 2021
 Ex-Franklin College president faces jury trial by Alexa Shrake, News and Tribune, reprinted from The Statehouse File, June 10, 2021
 Former Franklin College President Thomas Minar will face jury trial in March by Alexa Shrake, The Statehouse File, June 10, 2021, updated October 1, 2021
 A month from trial, Minar's defense team has filed no evidence or witnesses by Alexa Shrake, The Statehouse File, February 25, 2022

Plea deal and conviction
 Former Indiana college president found guilty of child enticement and child pornography charges by Kelli Arseneau, Green Bay Press-Gazette, reprinted by Yahoo Sports March 17, 2022
 Former Franklin College president pleads no contest to child sex crime charges by Lucas Gonzalez, WRTV Indianapolis, March 17, 2022
 District attorney's work on Minar case shows love for Wisconsin community by Sydney Byerly, The Statehouse File, March 17, 2022
 'Prison is a reality': Minar pleads no contest to child porn, enticement by Alexa Shrake, Daily Journal, March 17, 2022
 Uncovering Thomas Minar: A lifetime of achievement destroyed by consequences of hidden life by Isaac Gleitz, The Statehouse File'', March 18, 2022

Year of birth missing (living people)
Living people
Franklin College (Indiana)
Chicago Theological Seminary faculty
Northwestern University faculty
Pomona College alumni
Pomona College trustees
Kellogg School of Management alumni
Northwestern University alumni